Nurney is a village in County Carlow, Ireland.

Historic sites
The name suggests that there may have been a monastic site on the site in the 4th or 5th century. St. John's Church (Church of Ireland) is a listed structure, which was built by the local landlord John Bruen in the 1780s along with a schoolhouse.

Nurney Cross, located near St. John's Church, is a very early example of a high cross and is a National Monument.

Sports
Nurney is home to Nurney Villa, an association football (soccer) club which competes in the Carlow Premier Division.

See also
List of towns and villages in Ireland

References

Towns and villages in County Carlow